New Franklin may refer to:

New Franklin, Missouri
New Franklin, Ohio:
New Franklin, Stark County, Ohio
New Franklin, Summit County, Ohio
New Franklin, Pennsylvania